The Kentucky High School Athletic Association boys' and girls' state basketball championships are single elimination tournaments held each March featuring 16 high schools. Colloquially known as the Sweet Sixteen (the KHSAA holds a trademark on the phrase). Since 2019, both the boys' and girls' tournaments takes place over four days at downtown Lexington's Rupp Arena.

History 
The Kentucky High School Boys' Basketball State Tournament began in 1918. For fourteen years there were 18 regions that encompassed the tournament. Since 1932 there have only been 16 regions thus the term "Sweet Sixteen" was coined. Kentucky is one of only two states (Delaware is the other) that still play a state tournament without a class system that divides large and small schools into separate tournaments.

The first six tournaments were held at the University of Kentucky gymnasium in Lexington. After 1923 the tournament continued in Lexington but moved to the new Alumni Gymnasium on UK's campus which had become the new venue for the university's basketball teams, where it stayed from 1924 until 1944. In 1945 the tournament moved to the Louisville Gardens until 1950, when it moved back to Lexington and took up residence at Memorial Coliseum, again on the UK campus. Once construction was complete on Freedom Hall in Louisville, the 1957 tournament was held there and returned in odd-numbered years.

In 1965, Freedom Hall agreed to host the tournament for fourteen consecutive years until 1978. The opening of Rupp Arena in 1979 led to the tournament's return to Lexington, where it remains to the present day. However, Freedom Hall has hosted the tournament six times since then, the most recent being in 1994.

Both the boys' and girls' tournaments were cancelled in 2020 due to the COVID-19 pandemic.

Notable participants

Boys' Tournament

2022 Boys' Tournament Results 

Note: First round seeds indicate ordinal position by region, match-ups are determined by random draw.

Boys' Basketball State Championship

Tournament results, by year

Championships, by school

KHSAA Girls' Sweet Sixteen State Champions

Schools with at least three boys' state championships

Schools with at least two girls' state championships

Notes and references

Basketball in Kentucky
High school basketball competitions in the United States